Raad-500 missile (Persian: موشک رعد ۵۰۰) is an Iranian SRBM/Tactical ballistic missile which is equipped with a progressive composite engine that is dubbed as "Zohair (Persian: زهیر)". Raad-500 means "Thunder 500", and it has been designed by half --weight-- in comparison with the previous Iranian missile (Fateh-110) whose body was made from metal; whereas the range of this new Iranian ballistic missile increased two hundred kilometers more than Fateh-110), and its final range is 500 kilometers.

The Raad-500, is significantly shorter than its predecessor (7.61m compared to 8.86m) yet can reportedly reach 500 km. Its warhead is smaller but still powerful, and designed to separate in the early midcourse phase, making it more difficult to detect, track, and intercept than unibody missiles like the Fateh-110, or those with warheads that separate in the terminal phase.

Engine 

This ballistic missile possesses an engine which has been made of carbon fiber composites, and makes the engine shield able to bear pressures up to one hundred bars.

Unveiling 
Raad-500 missile was unveiled on 9 February 2020 in Tehran by the attendance of IRGC's Chief Commander Major General Hossein Salami, and likewise Brigadier General Amir-Ali Hajizadeh, commander of Aerospace Force of the Islamic Revolutionary Guard Corps.

See also 
 Khorramshahr (missile)
 Dezful (missile)
 Fateh-110
 List of military equipment manufactured in Iran
 Iran Electronics Industries
 Science and technology in Iran

References 

Short-range ballistic missiles of Iran
Surface-to-surface missiles of Iran
Theatre ballistic missiles
Tactical ballistic missiles of Iran
Weapons and ammunition introduced in 2020